NGC 254 is a lenticular galaxy located in the constellation Sculptor. It was discovered by John Herschel in 1834. It is in a galaxy group with NGC 134.

NGC 254 is an example of a ring galaxy, a galaxy with a ring, and in this case, no central bar. Across the entire galaxy disk, there is a disk of ionized gas rotating in the direction opposite the stellar disk's rotation. This situation may have arose when a retrograde-orbiting satellite galaxy accreted onto the galaxy itself, some 1 billion years ago.

See also 
 List of NGC objects

References

External links 
 

Sculptor (constellation)
Unbarred lenticular galaxies
Ring galaxies
Astronomical objects discovered in 1834
0254
002778